Iolaus christofferi is a butterfly in the family Lycaenidae. It is found in northern Cameroon. The habitat consists of dry savanna.

Etymology
The species is named for the Swedish lepidopterist Per Olof Christopher Aurivillius.

References

Butterflies described in 2003
Iolaus (butterfly)
Endemic fauna of Cameroon
Butterflies of Africa